Shamov is a Russian masculine surname, its feminine counterpart is Shamova. Notable people with the surname include:

Nikolay Shamov (born 1936), Soviet Olympic ski jumper
Yegor Shamov (born 1994), Russian football goalkeeper

Russian-language surnames